Società Sportiva Dilettante Domegliara is an Italian association football club located in Domegliara, a frazione of Sant'Ambrogio di Valpolicella, Veneto. It currently plays in Serie D. Its colors are red and black.

Domegliara were promoted from the Promozione to the Eccellenza Veneto following a 2nd-place finish in 2005–06.  They bettered that feat by finishing 1st in Group A of the Eccellenza Veneto the following year.  That earned them promotion to Serie D for the first time in their history.

External links
 Official homepage
 Domegliara page @ Serie-D.com

Football clubs in Italy
Football clubs in Veneto
Association football clubs established in 1927
1927 establishments in Italy